The Miyana are a Muslim community found in the state of Gujarat in India.

History and origin 

The Miyana are Rajputs who were converted to Islam during the rule of Allauddin Khilji in the thirteenth century. According to other traditions, they were Rajputs of Sindh who immigrated to Kutch during the period of Jadeja rule.

Present circumstances 

The Miyana are found throughout Kutch and Saurashtra. They speak both Kutchi and Gujarati. The community is sub-divided into a number of clans, the main ones being Mahur, Movar, Manek, Bhatti (Jesalmer), Jam, Dhona, Katiya, Mokha, Maman, Gagda, samtani, Ladhani, Malani, Samani, Musani, Jeda, Traya, Manka, Khod, Makwana, Sandhvani, Kajediya, Kakkal, Baidmulla. Unlike other Muslim Rajput groups such as the Molesalam Rajput and Nayak in Gujarat, the Miyana do not practice gotra exogamy. Both parallel cousin and cross cousin marriages are preferred. The Miyana subsist by fishing and agriculture. Fishing is an important activity for the Kutchi Miyana. They have their own caste association, the Sunni muslim Jamaat Maliya Miyana.

See also
Molesalam Rajput
Muslim Nayaks

References 

Social groups of Gujarat
Muslim communities of India
Muslim communities of Gujarat
Tribes of Kutch